The 1956 Arizona State–Flagstaff Lumberjacks football team was an American football team that represented Arizona State College at Flagstaff (now known as Northern Arizona University) in the Frontier Conference during the 1956 NAIA football season. In their first year under head coach Max Spilsbury, the Lumberjacks compiled an 8–2 record (3–0 against conference opponents), won the Frontier Conference championship, and outscored opponents by a total of 311 to 93.

The team played its home games at Skidmore Field in Flagstaff, Arizona.

Schedule

References

Arizona State-Flagstaff
Northern Arizona Lumberjacks football seasons
Arizona State-Flagstaff Lumberjacks football